Sanah is a  feminine given name. Notable people with the name include:

 Sanah (singer) (born 1997), Polish singer and songwriter
 Sanah Moidutty (born 1991), Indian singer and songwriter
 Sanah Mollo (born 1987), South African women's footballer

Indian feminine given names